The Croatia national under-19 speedway team is the national under-19 motorcycle speedway team of Croatia and is controlled by the Croatian Motorcycle Federation. Croatian riders was started in Team U-19 European Championship once, in 2008. The best Croatian rider is Jurica Pavlic who was won two medals in Individual competition (gold medal in 2006 in Goričan, Croatia).

Competition

See also 
 Croatia national speedway team
 Croatia national under-21 speedway team

External links 
 (hr) Speedway at Croatian Motorcycle Federation webside

National speedway teams
Speedway
Speedway